>Abort, Retry, Fail?_ is an EP released in 1996 by White Town.

The title of the EP was taken from the DOS error message "Abort, Retry, Fail?". This referred to the problems White Town's sole member, Jyoti Mishra, had when a computer crashed during the production of the track. Mishra's liner notes and associated blog post of the single explain this with "I got the title for this single from the weekend I mixed the tracks. My hard drive went bonkers and I spent 72 hours reformatting the dang thing".

Charts

Year-end charts

Track listing

Notes

 The EP was released as both 4-track and 2-track CD singles. The cassette single contained only the first two tracks. The 12" single contained the first two tracks plus a remix of "Your Woman" by Scissorkicks.
 The trumpet on "Your Woman" is sampled from "My Woman" by Lew Stone and the Monseigneur Band. Mishra discovered the song via the 1978 BBC television series Pennies From Heaven.

References

External links
 Abort, Retry, Fail? EP White town

1996 EPs
Alternative rock EPs
Alternative dance EPs
White Town albums
Articles with underscores in the title